Leslie Calvin "Les" Brown (born February 17, 1945) is an American politician and motivational speaker. He was a member of the Ohio House of Representatives from 1977 to 1981.

Early life
Brown was born with his twin brother, Wesley, in Liberty City, a low-income section of Miami, Florida. He was adopted by Mamie Brown, a 38-year-old single woman who worked as a cafeteria attendant and domestic assistant. Brown claims that he was declared "educable mentally retarded" in grade school, which damaged his self-esteem and confidence.

Professional life
According to many of Brown's speeches, when he first decided to get his life into order, he went to a radio station he was repeatedly unsuccessful with his speeches. It was only after the on-air failures of the previous afternoon DJ that he was hired full-time. Upon his termination from the radio station, he ran for election in the Ohio House of Representatives and won. After leaving the Ohio State Legislature, he shifted his career to television and became a host on PBS.

From September to November 1993, he hosted a talk show, The Les Brown Show.

Brown was on KFWB in California for a daily syndicated radio program from 2011 to 2012.

Personal life
Brown married Gladys Knight in 1995. They divorced in 1997.

References

External links

1945 births
Democratic Party members of the Ohio House of Representatives
American motivational speakers
Living people
People associated with direct selling
American self-help writers
American twins
African-American state legislators in Ohio
21st-century African-American people
20th-century African-American people